Prokop Sieniawski (d. 9 January 1627 in Lwów) was a Polish noble.

Family 
Prokop was son of Adam Hieronim Sieniawski and Katarzyna Kostka. His younger brother was Mikołaj.

He married Anna Eufrozyna Chodkiewicz in 1623. They had two sons: Aleksander who died shortly after his father in 1627 as a 4-years old child, and Adam Hieronim Sieniawski.

Career 
He was Royal Rotmistrz from 1621 onward and Court Chorąży of the Crown after 1622.

According to some older authors, Prokop Sieniawski died in 1626. Stanisław Kurosz in his letter to Krzysztof Radziwiłł from 27 January 1627 stated that Prokop Sieniawski died on 9 January 1627 in Lwów.

Funeral oration of Prokop Sieniawski was told by his friend Jakub Sobieski.

Footnotes

Bibliography

1600s births
1627 deaths
17th-century Polish people
Prokop